Christopher Raymond Perry (December 4, 1761 – June 1, 1818) was an officer in the United States Navy who was appointed Chief Justice of the Court of Common Pleas for Washington County, Rhode Island, in 1780 and served until 1791.  He was the father of Oliver Hazard Perry and Matthew Calbraith Perry.

Early life
Perry was born on December 4, 1761, in Newport, Rhode Island, the son of the Hon. James Freeman Perry (1732–1813) and his wife, Mercy Hazard (1739–1810).  Christopher's father, Freeman, was a physician and surgeon.

Perry's paternal great-grandfather, Edward Perry, came from Devon, England, and settled in Sandwich, Massachusetts, around 1650 with his wife Mary Freeman.  On his mother's side Perry was a seventh-generation descendant of Captain Richard Raymond (1602–1692), and his wife, Julia, who was likely born in Essex, England, in 1602 and arrived in Salem, Massachusetts, about 1629, possibly with a contingent led by the Rev. Francis Higginson.  He was about 27 years old and later was a founder of Norwich, Connecticut, and an "honored fore-father of Saybrook".

Perry's mother was also a descendant of Governor Thomas Prence (1599–1673), a co-founder of Eastham, Massachusetts, who was a political leader in both the Plymouth and Massachusetts Bay colonies, and governor of Plymouth; and a descendant of Mayflower passengers, both of whom were signers of the Mayflower Compact, Elder William Brewster (c. 1567–1644), the Pilgrim colonist leader and spiritual elder of the Plymouth Colony, and George Soule (1593–1679), through his grandmother Susannah Barber Perry (1697–1755).

American Revolution
Christopher Perry enlisted, at the age of 14, in a local militia company named the Kingston Reds early in the American Revolution. He then served on a privateer commanded by a Captain Reed. After one cruise with Reed, Perry signed on to the privateer Mifflin commanded by George Wait Babcock. Mifflin was captured by the British and Perry was confined to the infamous prison ship Jersey in New York harbor for three months before he managed to escape.

In 1779, Perry joined the Continental Navy as a seaman aboard the frigate USS Trumbull commanded by Captain James Nicholson. On June 1, 1780, Trumbull engaged the British letter of marque Watt in a hard-fought, but indecisive, action in which Trumbull suffered 8 killed and 31 wounded compared to the Watts 13 killed and 79 wounded.

Perry then enlisted on another privateer which was captured off the coast of Great Britain. He then was taken as a prisoner to Newry Barracks in Ireland where he met his future wife, Sarah Wallace Alexander (1768–1830). Perry managed another escape by masquerading as a British seaman and taking passage to St. Thomas in the Virgin Islands. From St. Thomas he took passage to Charleston, South Carolina, shortly before the war's conclusion in 1783.

Post war
After the war, Perry served as a mate on a merchantman which sailed to Ireland where Perry was able to bring his beloved Sarah to the United States.  They were married in Philadelphia on August 2, 1784.  The young couple then moved to South Kingstown, Rhode Island, where they lived with Perry's parents on their 200-acre estate.  Their first child, Oliver Hazard Perry, was born in August 1785.

Perry then pursued his career as a merchant captain, making voyages all over the world and amassing a small fortune in the process.  He then decided to move his family to Newport, which was then an important shipping center and one of the largest cities in the newly independent United States.  By 1797, Perry had achieved enough financial security that he was able to retire to the small coastal town of Westerly in the southwest corner of Rhode Island.

Quasi War
On January 7, 1798, during the Quasi War with France, Perry was commissioned a captain in the U.S. Navy. Perry commanded the frigate General Greene, on which his son, then 13-year-old Oliver Hazard Perry, served as a midshipman.  General Greene was launched on January 21, 1799, departed on her first cruise on June 2, 1799, escorting five merchantmen to Havana, Cuba.  In Havana a yellow fever epidemic struck the ship which forced her to return to Newport on July 27.   General Greene departed on her next cruise to Santo Domingo on September 23.  On December 1 she, along with the frigate USS Boston captured the schooner Flying Fish and recaptured the American schooner Weymouth.  Among other duties General Green intercepted supplies to rebels fighting to overthrow General Toussaint Louverture who had led a successful slave revolt against the French in Haiti in 1791.

On April 27, General Greene brought two emissaries from Louverture to New Orleans where they went on to meet with President John Adams.  She left New Orleans on May 10, escorting twelve merchantmen to Havana.  As she neared Havana, a British 74 gun ship of the line intercepted the convoy and sent a boat towards one of the merchant ships so a boarding party could inspect the merchantman.  Perry fired a shot across the bow of to boat and the captain of the British warship brought his ship alongside the much smaller General Greene.  When the British captain demanded to know why Perry had fired on the boat, and remarked that it was very strange that a British ship of the line could not board an American merchant ship, Perry replied, "If she were a first rate ship (i.e. a ship mounting 100 guns), she should not do so to the dishonor of my flag!"  Apparently, the incident was resolved without further conflict.

General Greene returned to Newport on July 21, 1800, where most of her crew was discharged.  Perry was given orders to maintain General Greene in a high state of readiness, should her services be needed.  To his disappointment, Perry and General Greene were not given any other assignments during the Quasi War.

Perry, along with most of the other officers in the Navy, was discharged by the Peace Establishment Act of April 3, 1801, which greatly reduced both the Army and the Navy.  In the Navy, only nine of 42 captains were allowed to remain in service.

Personal life
On August 2, 1784, Perry married Sarah Wallace Alexander (1768–1830) in Philadelphia, Pennsylvania. She was born about 1768 in County Down, Ireland and died December 4, 1830, in New London, Connecticut. She was a descendant of an uncle of William Wallace, the Scottish knight and landowner who is known for leading a resistance during the Wars of Scottish Independence and is today remembered as a patriot and national hero.

Christopher and Sarah had five sons, all of whom were officers in the U.S. Navy who died in service, and three daughters:

 Commodore Oliver Hazard Perry (1785–1819), who married Elizabeth Champlin Mason in 1811.
 Lieutenant Raymond Henry Jones Perry (1789–1826), who served in the U.S. Navy from 1807 until his death.
 Sarah Wallace Perry (1791–1855), who never married.
 Commodore Matthew Calbraith Perry (1794–1858), who married Jane Slidell Perry (1816–1864)
 Anna Maria Perry (1797–1858), who married Commodore George Washington Rodgers (1787-1832). 
 Jane Tweedy Perry (1799–1875), who married William Butler Jr. (1790–1850), a surgeon and United States Congressman, in 1819.
 Lieutenant James Alexander Perry (1801–1822), who served in the U.S. Navy from 1811 until his death. Served with his brother Oliver at the Battle of Lake Erie at the age of 12.
 Purser Nathaniel Hazard Perry (1803–1832), who served as a purser (i.e., a supply and pay officer) in the U.S. Navy from 1820 until his death.

In 1800, Perry became the owner of a large house at 31 Walnut Street in Newport which is today known as the Knowles-Perry House.  It is probable that this was Perry's primary residence for the remainder of his life.

Captain Perry died in Newport in 1818 and is buried in the Belmont-Perry plot in the Island Cemetery in Newport, Rhode Island.  Aside from his wife, all those buried in the plot are either his descendants or their spouses.

Descendants

Captain Christopher Raymond Perry's descendants number in the thousands today. Some of his notable descendants include:

His eldest son, Oliver Hazard Perry (1785–1819), hero of the Battle of Lake Erie. Matthew Calbraith Perry, commander of the Perry Expedition to Japan. Brevet Brigadier General Alexander James Perry (1828–1913) was a career Army officer who graduated from West Point and served during the American Civil War. The Right Reverend James De Wolf Perry (1871–1947) served as Episcopal Bishop of Rhode Island and Presiding Bishop of the Episcopal Church.

Captain Perry's grandson, Rear Admiral Christopher Raymond Perry Rodgers (1819–1892) was an officer in the United States Navy who served in the Mexican–American War and the American Civil War, was Superintendent of the Naval Academy, and Commander-in-Chief of the Pacific Squadron. Rear Admiral Raymond Perry Rodgers (1849–1925), son of C.R.P. Rodgers, was an officer in the United States Navy and the second head of the Office of Naval Intelligence. Raymond Perry Rodgers's younger brother, Rear Admiral Thomas S. Rodgers (1858–1931), was an officer in the United States Navy who served in the Spanish–American War and World War I. Two other descendants of Captain Perry through his daughter Anna Maria Perry Rodgers were Calbraith Perry Rodgers (1879–1912), a pioneer American aviator who was the first civilian to purchase a Wright Flyer and the first to make a transcontinental flight, and Commander John Rodgers (1881–1926), an officer in the United States Navy and an early aviator.

Through his son Matthew's daughter, Caroline Slidell (née Perry) Belmont, he was the great-grandfather of statesman Perry Belmont (1851–1947), who served as a United States Representative from New York and the United States Minister to Spain, and also served as an officer in the U.S. Army during both the Spanish–American War and World War I. August Belmont Jr. (1853–1924), was an American financier, the builder of New York's Belmont Park racetrack, and a major owner/breeder of Thoroughbred racehorses. Oliver Hazard Perry Belmont (1858–1908) was a wealthy American socialite and United States Representative from New York; he was the second husband of Alva Vanderbilt Belmont.

Another of Captain Perry's great-grandsons, William Tiffany (1868–1898), a 2nd lieutenant in the 1st United States Volunteer Cavalry (a.k.a. Roosevelt's Rough Riders), died of yellow fever shortly after returning to the United States following his service in Cuba during the Spanish–American War. Matthew Calbraith Butler (1836–1909), son of Captain Perry's daughter Jane Tweedy Perry Butler, was an American military commander and politician from South Carolina who served as a major general in the Confederate States Army during the American Civil War, a post-bellum three-term United States Senator, and a major general in the United States Army during the Spanish–American War. Commander George Washington Rodgers (1822–1863), a grandson of Captain Perry and brother of Rear Admiral C.R.P. Rodgers, "was distinguished for his bravery in the silencing of Fort Sumter and the batteries on Morris Island."

References
Notes

Sources

 Martin, Samuel J., Southern Hero, Matthew Calbraith Butler, Stackpole Books, 2001. .

United States Navy officers
1761 births
1818 deaths
Christopher Raymond
American people of English descent
People from Newport, Rhode Island
Burials in Rhode Island
People from South Kingstown, Rhode Island